Jean Devaivre (1912–2004) was a French film director and screenwriter. Additionally, he worked as a dubbing director, preparing foreign-language films for release in France. The film Safe Conduct (Laissez-passer, 2002) directed by Bertrand Tavernier is based on Devaivre's activities in the French film industry during the wartime Occupation of France.

His brother Louis Devaivre was a film editor.

Selected filmography
 Shop Girls of Paris (1943)
 The Farm of Seven Sins (1949)
 Fugitive from Montreal (1950)
 Vendetta in Camargue (1950)
 My Wife, My Cow and Me (1952)
 Alarm in Morocco (1953)
 A Caprice of Darling Caroline (1953)
 Caroline and the Rebels (1955)

References

Bibliography
 Rège, Philippe. Encyclopedia of French Film Directors, Volume 1. Scarecrow Press, 2009.

External links

1912 births
2004 deaths
Film directors from Paris
20th-century French screenwriters